The House of Percy is an English noble family. They were among the most powerful noble families in Northern England for much of the Middle Ages. The noble family is known for its long rivalry with the House of Neville, another family powerful in northern England during the 15th century. The Percy-Neville feud  provoked the War of the Roses, at the time known as the Civil Wars, in England.

The House of Percy descends from William de Percy (d. 1096), a Frenchman who crossed over to England after William the Conqueror in early December 1067. William was created 1st feudal baron of Topcliffe in Yorkshire. He was rebuilding York Castle in 1070.

The Percy surname derives  from the manor of Percy-en-Auge in Normandy, the home of the Percy family at the time of the Norman Conquest. Family members have held the titles of Earl of Northumberland or Duke of Northumberland to this day, in addition to Baron Percy and others.

The Percy surname twice died out in the male line only to be re-adopted later by the husband or son of a Percy heiress. In the 12th century, the original Percy line was represented by Agnes de Percy, whose son by her husband Joscelin of Louvain adopted the surname. Again in the 18th century, the heiress Elizabeth Seymour married Sir Hugh Smithson, who adopted the surname Percy and was created Duke of Northumberland.

Earls of Northumberland

Dukes of Northumberland

Recurring names
Recurring names in the Percy genealogy include:
 Henry (first borne by the 7th feudal baron of Topcliffe and his 10 immediate successors, including the 1st Earl and Harry Hotspur)
 Hugh (first borne by the 1st Duke)
 Joscelin/Josceline (first borne by Joscelin of Louvain)
 Algernon (first borne by the 1st Baron as a nickname: Aux Gernons or "with moustaches").

Prominent members
Prominent members of the family include:
 (d. 1096), 1st feudal baron of Topcliffe, Yorkshire, nicknamed "Aux Gernons" ("with moustaches"), a Norman who emigrated to England at the time of the Conquest
Alan de Percy, 2nd feudal baron of Topcliffe (d. circa 1130–5)
William II de Percy, 3rd feudal baron of Topcliffe  (d. 1174–5), who left two daughters Maud and Agnes as co-heiresses.
Agnes de Percy (1134-1205), married Joscelin of Louvain (d.1180).   He was a son of Godfrey I, Count of Louvain of the House of Louvain, ancestor of the Dukes of Brabant , House of Hesse, and so the Mountbattens) either by his second wife, Clementia of Burgundy, or by a mistress (see Dukes of Brabant family tree).  He was also brother-in-law to King Henry I, whose second wife was Joscelin's step-sister Adeliza of Louvain.
Richard de Percy (d. 1244), 5th feudal baron of Topcliffe, signatory to Magna Carta. Died childless. Succeeded his elder brother Henry de Percy (d.1198), the 4th Baron Topcliffe, whose son William III de Percy (1197-1245) became Richard's heir.
William de Percy,  (1197–1245), 6th feudal baron of Topcliffe
Henry de Percy, 7th feudal baron of Topcliffe (1228–1272)
Henry de Percy, 1st Baron Percy of Alnwick (1273–1314), 7th feudal baron of Topcliffe and 1st baron by writ.
Henry de Percy, 2nd Baron Percy of Alnwick (1299–1352)
Henry de Percy, 3rd Baron Percy of Alnwick (see below)
Thomas Percy (d. 1369), Bishop of Norwich
Henry de Percy, 3rd Baron Percy of Alnwick (1320–1368)
Henry Percy, 1st Earl of Northumberland (1341–1408) (forfeit 1405), helped Henry IV seize the throne, later rebelled against him
Sir Henry Percy (1364/1366–1403), also called Harry Hotspur, helped Henry IV seize the throne but later rebelled against him, killed at the Battle of Shrewsbury
Henry Percy, 2nd Earl of Northumberland (see below)
Lady Elizabeth Percy (c. 1390 – 1437)
Henry Percy, 2nd Earl of Northumberland (1394–1455), supporter of King Henry VI, killed at the beginning of the Wars of the Roses
Henry Percy, 3rd Earl of Northumberland (see below)
Thomas Percy, 1st Baron Egremont (1422–1460)
Katherine Percy, Countess of Kent (1423 – c. 1475)
Ralph Percy (d.1464), knight, Lancastrian supporter in the Wars of the Roses
William Percy (1428–1462), Bishop of Carlisle
Henry Percy, 3rd Earl of Northumberland (1421–1461) (forfeit 1461), Lancastrian leader in the Wars of the Roses, killed at the Battle of Towton
Henry Percy, 4th Earl of Northumberland (see below)
Margaret Percy (b. c. 1447)
Henry Percy, 4th Earl of Northumberland (1449–1489) (restored 1470), aligned with Yorkists, present but inactive at the Battle of Bosworth Field
Henry Algernon Percy, 5th Earl of Northumberland (see below)
Eleanor Percy, Duchess of Buckingham (1474–1530), daughter of the 4th Earl
Alan Percy (c. 1480 – 1560), son of the 4th Earl, English churchman and academic
Anne FitzAlan, Countess of Arundel (1485–1552), daughter of the 4th Earl
Thomas Percy (1560–1605), great-grandson of the 4th Earl, participated in the Gunpowder Plot
Henry Algernon Percy, 5th Earl of Northumberland (1478–1527)
Henry Percy, 6th Earl of Northumberland (1502–1537), betrothed to Anne Boleyn
Thomas Percy (c. 1504 – 1537), participated the Pilgrimage of Grace revolt
Blessed Thomas Percy, 7th Earl of Northumberland (1528–1572) (forfeit 1571; restored 1572), led the Rising of the North
Henry Percy, 8th Earl of Northumberland (see below)
Henry Percy, 8th Earl of Northumberland (1532–1585)
Henry Percy, 9th Earl of Northumberland (see below)
George Percy (1580–1632), explorer, author, early governor of Virginia
Henry Percy, 9th Earl of Northumberland (1564–1632), known as "The Wizard Earl" for his intellectual pursuits, imprisoned after the Gunpowder Plot
Dorothy Sidney, Countess of Leicester (c. 1598 – 1659)
Lucy Hay, Countess of Carlisle (1599–1660)
Algernon Percy, 10th Earl of Northumberland (see below)
Henry Percy, Baron Percy of Alnwick (d.1659), royalist in the English Civil War
Algernon Percy, 10th Earl of Northumberland (1602–1668), Lord High Admiral of England, later a Parliamentarian in the English Civil War
Joceline Percy, 11th Earl of Northumberland (1644–1670), no male heirs, becomes the last male of direct Percy lineage to inherit the Earldom.
Elizabeth Seymour, Duchess of Somerset (1667–1722), only daughter and heiress of the 11th Earl
Algernon Seymour, 7th Duke of Somerset, 1st Earl of Northumberland (1684–1750), son of Elizabeth Seymour 
Elizabeth Percy (née Seymour), Duchess of Northumberland, 2nd Baroness Percy (1716–1776), daughter and heiress of the 7th Duke of Somerset, married Sir Hugh Smithson (who adopted the name Percy) 
Hugh Percy, 1st Duke of Northumberland (1714–1786), né Smithson
Hugh Percy, 2nd Duke of Northumberland (1742–1817), British army officer during the American Revolutionary War
Hugh Percy, 3rd Duke of Northumberland (1785–1847)
Algernon Percy, 4th Duke of Northumberland (1792–1865)
Algernon Percy, 1st Earl of Beverley (1750–1830), second son of the 1st Duke
George Percy, 2nd Earl of Beverley, 5th Duke of Northumberland (see below)
Algernon Percy (1779–1833), diplomat
Hugh Percy (1784–1856), bishop
Josceline Percy (1784–1856), Royal Navy officer
William Henry Percy (1788–1855), Royal Navy officer
George Percy, 2nd Earl of Beverley, 5th Duke of Northumberland (1778–1867), politician
Algernon George Percy, 6th Duke of Northumberland (see below)
Lord Josceline Percy (1811–1881), politician
Lord Henry Percy (1817–1877), lieutenant-general in the British Army
Algernon George Percy, 6th Duke of Northumberland (1810–1899), politician
Henry George Percy, 7th Duke of Northumberland (see below)
Lord Algernon Percy (1851–1933), politician
Henry George Percy, 7th Duke of Northumberland (1846–1918), politician
Henry Percy, Earl Percy (1871–1909), politician
Alan Ian Percy, 8th Duke of Northumberland (see below)
Eustace Percy, 1st Baron Percy of Newcastle (1887–1958), politician
Alan Ian Percy, 8th Duke of Northumberland (1880–1930)
Henry George Alan Percy, 9th Duke of Northumberland (1912–1940), killed in World War II
Hugh Algernon Percy, 10th Duke of Northumberland (see below)
Elizabeth Douglas-Hamilton, Duchess of Hamilton and Brandon (1916–2008)
Hugh Algernon Percy, 10th Duke of Northumberland (1914–1988)
Henry Alan Walter Richard Percy, 11th Duke of Northumberland (1953–1995)
Ralph George Algernon Percy, 12th Duke of Northumberland (b. 1956)
Lady Katie Percy (b. 1982)
George Dominic Percy, Earl Percy (b. 1984)
Lady Melissa Jane Percy (b. 1987)
Lord Max Percy (b. 1990), husband of Princess Nora of Oettingen-Spielberg

Family tree
part of this is taken from the article on the Duke of Northumberland

This summary genealogical tree shows how the current house of Percy is related:

Coats of arms

Paternal arms of Henry de Percy, 1st Baron Percy (1273–1314): Azure, five fusils in fess or,("Percy ancient")  which he abandoned in favour of right: Or, a lion rampant azure ("Percy modern"/Brabant) Both arms were quartered by the Percy Earls of Northumberland and remain quartered by the present Duke of Northumberland

Buildings associated with the Percy family

Topcliffe Castle, Yorkshire, recorded in the Domesday Book of 1086 as held by William I de Percy (d.1096), whom it served as the caput of the feudal barony of Topcliffe. The Percy family's most ancient English seat.
Petworth, Sussex, acquired by Joscelin of Louvain (d.1180), husband of Agnes de Percy, one of the two daughters and co-heiresses of William II de Percy (d.1174–5), feudal baron of Topcliffe in Yorkshire (grandson of William I de Percy (d.1096)). Jocelin's younger son Richard "de Percy" (d.1244) adopted the surname "de Percy" and inherited his father's estate of Petworth and a moiety of his maternal barony of Topcliffe. Richard died without progeny when his estates descended to his nephew William III "de Percy" (1197-1245), grandson of Jocelin de Louvain, who had inherited the other moiety of Topcliffe from his great-aunt Maud de Percy.

Alnwick Castle, Northumberland, purchased in 1309 by Henry de Percy, 1st Baron Percy (1273–1314) from Anthony Bek, Prince Bishop of Durham.
Warkworth Castle, Northumberland
Cockermouth Castle, Cumbria, inherited by Henry Percy, 1st Earl of Northumberland (1341-1408) and his heirs male, from his 2nd wife Maud de Lucy, sister and heiress of Anthony de Lucy, 3rd Baron Lucy (d.1368), on condition that they should bear the arms of Lucy (Gules, three lucies hauriant argent) quarterly with their own.
Egremont Castle, Cumbria, purchased in 1529 by Henry Percy, 15th Earl of Northumberland from Robert Radclyffe, 1st Earl of Sussex (1483–1542).
Leconfield Castle, Yorkshire.
Syon House, Isleworth, Middlesex, the former Syon Monastery, acquired in 1594 by Henry Percy, 9th Earl of Northumberland (1564-1632).

Following the death of his grandson Algernon Seymour, 7th Duke of Somerset in 1750, the former Percy estates were split between the Smithson ("Percy", Duke of Northumberland) and Wyndham (Earl of Egremont) families

See also
 Percy (surname)
 Percy (given name)
 Percy (disambiguation)

References

External links

 European Heraldry page

1067 establishments in England
Anglo-Norman families
 
English families
Noble families of the United Kingdom